The Cidade de Deus (City of God) is a West Zone neighborhood of the city of Rio de Janeiro. It is also known as CDD among its inhabitants.

The neighborhood was founded in 1960, planned and executed by the government of Guanabara State as part of the policy to systematically remove slums (favelas) from the center of Rio de Janeiro and resettle their inhabitants in the suburbs.

It is used as backdrop in the 2002 film City of God.  In 2009, it was occupied by a Pacifying Police Unit.

Basic statistics

 Area (2003): 1.2058 km2 (0.4656 mi2; 298 acres)
 Population (2000): 38,016
 Residences (2000): 10,866
 Administrative region: XXXIV - Cidade de Deus

In literature and film
Known in English as City of God, Cidade de Deus is the eponymous name of a 1997 semi-autobiographical novel by Paulo Lins, about three young men and their lives of petty crime during the 1960s, 1970s and 1980s in the favela where Lins grew up. An English translation by Alison Entrekin was published in 2006. The novel was filmed by Fernando Meirelles (director of The Constant Gardener and Blindness) in 2002 under the same title City of God, with most of the cast from real-life favelas and in some cases, from Cidade de Deus itself. After filming, the producers set up help groups promising to help those involved to build more promising futures. In 2004, the film received four Academy Award nominations for cinematography, for director Meirelles, for editing and for adapted screenplay by Mantovani. In 2005, Time chose it as one of the 100 greatest films of all time. The tagline "If you run, the beast catches; if you stay, the beast eats", is analogous to the English aphorism "Damned if you do, damned if you don't".

Local currency
In 2011, a local currency called CDD was created for use exclusively in the Cidade de Deus, to encourage inhabitants to spend more locally, thus boosting the local economy. The currency is subsidized. Its value is indexed to about 20% higher than the national currency, the Brazilian real.

References

External links

 Cidade de Deus Web Portal (in Portuguese)
 Cidade de Deus on Google Maps
 Inside City of God - slideshow by The New York Times
 City of God movie official website

Favelas
Neighbourhoods in Rio de Janeiro (city)
Populated places established in 1960
1960 establishments in Brazil